Alto Mijares (Valencian: Alt Millars) is a comarca in the province of Castellón, Valencian Community, Spain. It is part of the Spanish-speaking area in the Valencian Community.

Municipalities 
The comarca consists of twenty-two municipalities, listed below with their populations:

References

 
Comarques of the Valencian Community
Geography of the Province of Castellón